The Diocese of Winchester forms part of the Province of Canterbury of the Church of England. Founded in 676, it is one of the older dioceses in England. It once covered Wessex, many times its present size which is today most of the historic enlarged version of Hampshire.

Territory
The area of the diocese is an area of eastern Dorset, and modern Hampshire, including the city of Southampton, with four exceptions:
the south-eastern quarter of the county (which together with the Isle of Wight constitutes the Diocese of Portsmouth)
an area in the north-east (in the Diocese of Guildford)
a small area in the west (in the Diocese of Salisbury)
one parish in the north (in the Diocese of Oxford)

The diocese historically covered a much larger area, see below. In the most recent major revision in 1927, the Archdeaconry of Surrey was removed to form the new Diocese of Guildford, and south-eastern Hampshire and the Isle of Wight were removed to form the Diocese of Portsmouth.

The Bishop of Winchester is ex officio a Lord Spiritual of the Westminster Parliament, one of five clerics (specifically certain prelates) of the Church of England with such automatic entitlement. The bishop is also Prelate of the Most Noble Order of the Garter, that office having been held by every Bishop of Winchester since the order was created.

Bishops
The Bishop of Winchester heads the diocese and is assisted by two suffragan bishops, the bishops of Southampton (Debbie Sellin) and of Basingstoke (David Williams), who are informally responsible for the north and south of the diocese respectively (roughly corresponding to the archdeaconries of Winchester and Bournemouth). From 1927 until the suffragan See of Basingstoke was created in 1973, the Bishop of Southampton was the suffragan bishop for the whole diocese. There had previously also been suffragan sees of Guildford (1874–1927) and of Dorking (1905–1909).

Other bishops living in the diocese are licensed as honorary assistant bishops:
2009–present: Christopher Herbert, retired diocesan Bishop of St Albans, lives outside the diocese, in Wrecclesham, Surrey.
2012–present: Timothy Bavin, oblate master at Alton Abbey, is a retired Bishop of Portsmouth who is licensed as an honorary assistant bishop in both Winchester (in which diocese the abbey lies) and Portsmouth dioceses.

Alternative episcopal oversight for parishes in the diocese which do not accept the sacramental ministry of women priests is provided by the provincial episcopal visitor, Norman Banks, suffragan Bishop of Richborough, who is licensed as an honorary assistant bishop for ministry in the diocese. Traditionally, the Channel Islands were part of the diocese. After a conflict with the 97th bishop, oversight of the Channel Islands had been delegated from 2014 to 2019 to Trevor Willmott, an honorary assistant bishop of the diocese and, until his 2019 retirement, Bishop of Dover. In January 2021, the Channel Islands were transferred permanently to the Diocese of Salisbury.

2021 rebellion
On 20 May 2021, it was reported that Bishop of Winchester Tim Dakin had "stepped back" as bishop for six weeks in light of the threat of a diocesan synod motion of no confidence in his leadership. Williams also "stepped back" and Sellin served as acting diocesan bishop. Dakin did not return to active ministry, and in February 2022 resigned his See and retired.

History 

The Diocese of Winchester is one of the oldest and most influential in England. Originally it was the see of the kingdom of Wessex (as such it is sometimes called the "Diocese of Wessex"), with the first cathedra at lost Dorchester Cathedral which site is commemorated by later medieval Dorchester Abbey church in south-central Oxfordshire. The cathedral was founded and served successively by Saints Birinus and Agilbert, the first a missionary sent from Rome. This Wessex diocese not only covered most of Hampshire, Isle of Wight, Surrey, Berkshire, parts of Oxfordshire and Wiltshire but for the first few decades three more south-western counties mentioned below. The bishop's seat was swiftly transferred to Winchester in AD 660: the episcopal cathedral see was, at some point, at Old Minster, Winchester. Around 704–705, Aldhelm saw the four south-west peninsular counties of England, save for Cornwall, form the Diocese of Sherborne. To Devon, Somerset and Dorset, Cornwall was added at the end of the ninth century. These were well-settled and healthy counties in relative terms and in about 909 Sherborne was divided in three with the creation of the bishoprics of Wells, covering Somerset, and Crediton, covering Devon and Cornwall, leaving Sherborne comprising Dorset.  Winchester shed north-western lands in AD 909 such that Wiltshire and Berkshire and the parts of Oxfordshire formed the See of Ramsbury, with its seat being Salisbury Cathedral.

The see of the Bishop of Winchester ran from the Isle of Wight and later the Channel Islands to the south bank of the River Thames at Southwark close to London Bridge where the remnant shell of his palace is Winchester Palace. It formed one of the largest and richest sees.  During the Middle Ages, the rump diocese left of all areas appertaining to Hampshire and Surrey before those counties shrank was one of the wealthiest English sees, owning for instance the rectories (the feudal landlord's interest in farms, fisheries, mills and great or small tithes) of many churches in its former, greater area and even in Norman France. Its bishops included a number of politically prominent Englishmen, notably the 9th century Saint Swithun and medieval magnates including William of Wykeham and Henry of Blois.

In the 1530s the diocese faced low compensation for the confiscation of its accumulated wealth and monastic feudal dues and lands in the Dissolution of the Monasteries such as, principally, the pensioning of abbots and friars and in some cases granting of the rectories to the incumbent priests. Later the diocese found it difficult to prevent unlawful, nefarious subletting of some of its buildings, for morally dubious purposes such as connected with the numerous British Empire wharves involved in the slave trade often due to the distance, physically and legally from the perpetrators in ownership/operating structure of diocesan clergy and administrators as chief landlords. In the early 19th century office holders lobbied hard with other bishops to bring to an end the trade in the House of Lords, through its missionaries, and in the messages preached across the diocese itself.

The Report of the Commissioners appointed by his Majesty to inquire into the Ecclesiastical Revenues of England and Wales (1835) found the Winchester see was the third wealthiest in England, after Canterbury and London, with an annual net income of £11,151.

By the 19th century much of the non-church buildings estate of the church had been lost, some statutorily such as by the Tithe Acts procedures but much willingly sold for urban church building.  Many schools built by the diocese transferred to state hands in the process of secularisation and National school charitable movement as it evolved under Disraeli.  Many schools were co-founded by the diocese in the 20th century and various remain supported by the diocese.

Channel Islands component
The Channel Islands were transferred from the Diocese of Coutances in Normandy, France, in 1500 by papal bull. The transfer was later confirmed by a letter from Elizabeth I and an order in council dated 11 March 1569 which expressly perpetually united the islands with the diocese and, for avoidance of doubt, the bishop, which remains the law. The islands have for centuries operated their own canon law variants under the bishop. The islands were voluntarily removed from the present bishop's involvement in 2014 after a dispute with Bishop Dakin, who agreed to their Anglican churches' worship, work and ethos being overseen by Trevor Willmott, then the Bishop of Dover. This measure is ratified by the parent province authorities of Canterbury as interim. It arises by use of the powers of episcopal delegation: Bishop Dakin delegates his authority up to the Archbishop of Canterbury who in turn delegates it down to the Bishop of Dover. Bishop Willmott was previously Bishop of Basingstoke, a suffragan see of the Winchester diocese, and in that capacity was familiar with the islands' preferences.

Notoriety of the Liberty of the Clink

A small area of Southwark for centuries lay outside the jurisdiction of the City of London, and that of the county authorities of Surrey, and some activities forbidden in those areas were permitted within it.

In 1161 Bishop Henry (and successors) was granted power to license prostitutes and brothels in the liberty by King Henry II. The prostitutes were known as Winchester Geese, and many are buried in Cross Bones, unconsecrated ground. Similarly, to "be bitten by a Winchester goose" (mid 16th-17th century) meant "to have/contract a venereal disease", and "goose bumps" was slang for symptoms of venereal diseases. Theatres and playhouses were allowed in the Clink; the most famous was the Globe Theatre where William Shakespeare performed his plays. Another was The Rose, where Shakespeare and Christopher Marlowe both premiered plays. Bull and bear baiting were also permitted.

Archdeaconries and deaneries 

*including Cathedral

Additionally, from shortly after 6 April 2014 Paul Moore was instituted "Archdeacon for Mission Development"; this had no sub-territory and was a role to help reach out (mission). His appointment ended in 2020.

Churches

Not in a deanery

Deanery of Alresford

Deanery of Alton

Deanery of Andover

Deanery of Basingstoke

Deanery of Odiham

Deanery of Whitchurch

Deanery of Winchester

Deanery of Bournemouth

Deanery of Christchurch

Deanery of Eastleigh

Deanery of Lyndhurst

Deanery of Romsey

Deanery of Southampton

Deanery of Jersey

Deanery of Guernsey

References

External links
 

 
676 establishments
7th-century establishments in England
Dorchester
Winchester
Winchester
Dorchester
Wessex